Rupert is an unincorporated community in Taylor County, Georgia, United States. Rupert has a post office with ZIP code 31081.

References

Unincorporated communities in Taylor County, Georgia
Unincorporated communities in Georgia (U.S. state)